This list of the Mesozoic life of Maryland contains the various prehistoric life-forms whose fossilized remains have been reported from within the US state of Maryland and are between 252.17 and 66 million years of age.

A

 Acirsa
 †Acirsa americana – or unidentified related form
 †Acirsa clathrata
 †Acirsa flexicostata
  †Acrocanthosaurus – or unidentified comparable form
  †Acteon
 †Acteon cicatricosus
 †Acutostrea
 †Acutostrea plumosa
 †Aenona
 †Aenona eufaulensis
 †Aenona georgiana
  †Agerostrea
 †Agerostrea mesenterica
  †Allognathosuchus – or unidentified comparable form
 †Allosaurus
 †Allosaurus medius – type locality for species
 †Ambigostrea
 †Ambigostrea tecticosta
 Amuletum
 †Amuletum dumasensis
 †Amuletum fasciolatum – or unidentified comparable form
  †Amyda
 †Amyda prisca
 †Anatimya
 †Anatimya anteradiata
 †Ancilla
 †Ancilla acutula
 †Anomalofusus
 †Anomalofusus lemniscatus
  †Anomia
 †Anomia argentaria
 †Anomia ornata
 †Anomoeodus
 †Anomoeodus latidens
 †Anomoeodus phaseolus
 †Anteglossia
 †Aphrodina
 †Aphrodina tippana
 †Araloselachus
 †Araloselachus cuspidata
 †Arctostrea
 †Arctostrea falacata
 †Argillomys – type locality for genus
 †Argillomys marylandensis – type locality for species
 †Ariadnaesporites
 †Ariadnaesporites intermedius – type locality for species
 Arrhoges
 †Arundelconodon – type locality for genus
 †Arundelconodon hottoni – type locality for species
 †Arundelemys – type locality for genus
 †Arundelemys dardeni – type locality for species
 Astarte
 †Astarte culebrensis
  †Astrodon
 †Astrodon johnstoni – type locality for species

B

   †Baculites
 †Baculites baculus
 †Baculites elisasi
 †Baculites vertebralis
 †Bathytormus
 †Bathytormus pteropsis
 †Bellifusus
 †Bellifusus curvicostatus
 †Belliscala
 †Beretra
 †Beretra gracilis – or unidentified comparable form
 †Beretra ripleyana
 †Beretra speciosa
 †Bottosaurus
 †Bottosaurus harlani
 Botula
 †Botula conchafodentis
 †Botula lingua
 †Botula ripleyana
 †Buccinopsis
 †Buccinopsis crassicostata

C

 Cadulus
 †Cadulus obnutus
 Caestocorbula
 †Caestocorbula crassaplica
 †Caestocorbula crassiplica
 †Caestocorbula percompressa
 †Caestocorbula terramaria
 †Camptonectes
 †Camptonectes bubonis
  Carcharias
 †Carcharias holmdelensis
 †Carcharias samhammeri
 †Cardiaster
 †Cardiaster marylandicus
 
 †Caveola
 †Caveola acuta
  †Ceratodus
 †Ceratodus kranzi – type locality for species
  Cerithium
 †Cerithium weeksi – or unidentified related form
  Chiloscyllium
 †Chiloscyllium greeni
  †Cimoliasaurus
 †Cimoliasaurus magnus
 †Clavatipollenites
 †Clavipholas
 †Clavipholas pectorosa
 †Clavipholas pectrosa
 †Coelosaurus
 †Coelosaurus affinis
  †Coelosaurus antiquus
 †Coelurus
 †Coelurus gracilis – type locality for species
 †Corax
 †Corax pristiodontus
  Corbula
 †Corbula subradiata
 †Corymya – or unidentified comparable form
 †Corymya tennis
 †Couperites
 †Couperites mauldinensis
 Crassatella
 †Crassatella vadosa
 †Crenella
 †Crenella elegantula
 †Crenella serica
 †Creonella
 †Creonella subangulata – or unidentified comparable form
 †Creonella triplicata
  †Cretolamna
 †Cretolamna appendiculata
 †Cretolamna serrata – or unidentified comparable form
 Cucullaea
 †Cucullaea capax
 †Cuna
 †Cuna texana
 †Cuneolus
 †Cuneolus pectrosa
 †Cuneolus tippana
 Cuspidaria
 †Cuspidaria ampulla
 †Cyclorisma
 †Cyclorisma parva
 Cylichna
 †Cylichna diversilirata
 †Cylichna incisa
 †Cylindracanthus
 †Cymbophora
 †Cymbophora appressa
 †Cymbophora berryi
 †Cymbophora wordeni
 †Cymella
 †Cymella bella
 †Cyprimeria
 †Cyprimeria alta
 †Cyprimeria depressa
 †Cyprimeria major

D

 Dasyatis
  †Deinonychus
 †Deinonychus antirrhopus
  †Deinosuchus
 †Deinosuchus rugosus
 †Dentalium
 †Dentalium leve
 †Deussenia
 †Deussenia bellalirata
 †Deussenia ripleyana
 †Discoscaphites
 †Discoscaphites abyssinius
 †Discoscaphites conradi
 †Discoscaphites gulosus
 †Discoscaphites iris
 †Drilluta
 †Drilluta buboanus
 †Drilluta distans
 †Drilluta marylandicus

E

 †Egertonia
 †Ellipsoscapha
 †Ellipsoscapha cylindrica
 †Ellipsoscapha mortoni
 †Ellipsoscapha occidentalis – or unidentified comparable form
  †Enchodus
 †Enchodus dirus
 †Enchodus ferox
 †Enchodus feroz
 †Endoptygma
 †Endoptygma leprosa
 †Eoacteon
 †Eoacteon linteus
 †Etea
 †Etea carolinensis
 †Eubaculites
 †Eubaculites carinatus
 †Eubaculites latecarinatus
 †Eufistulana
 †Eufistulina
 †Eulima
 †Eulima clara
 †Eulima monmouthensis
 †Euspira
 †Euspira rectilabrum
 †Euspira reetilabrum
  †Eutrephoceras
 †Eutrephoceras dekayi
 †Ewingia
 †Ewingia problematica
  †Exogyra
 †Exogyra costata

F

 †Flabellosmilia
 †Flabellosmilia vaughani
 †Fulgerca
 †Fulgerca attenuata – or unidentified related form
 †Fusimilis
 †Fusimilis kummeli
 †Fusimilis novemcostatus
 †Fusimilis tippanus

G

 Galeorhinus
 †Galeorhinus giradoti
 Ginglymostoma
 Glossus
 Glycimeris
 †Glycimeris mortoni
 Glycymeris
 †Glycymeris rotundata
  †Glyptops
 †Glyptops caelatus – type locality for species
 †Goniochasma
  †Goniopholis
 †Goniopholis affinis – type locality for species
  †Grallator – or unidentified comparable form
 †Granocardium
 †Granocardium dumosum
 †Granocardium eufalense
 †Granocardium kuemmeli
 †Granocardium kummeli
 †Granocardium lowei
 †Graphidula
 †Graphidula multicostata
 †Graphidula terebriformis
 †Gryphaeostrea
 †Gryphaeostrea vomer
 Gyrodes
 †Gyrodes americanus
 †Gyrodes spillmani
 †Gyrodes subcarinatus
 †Gyrodes supraplicatus

H

 †Hadrodus
  †Halisaurus
 †Halisaurus platyspondylus
 †Hamatia – type locality for genus
 †Hamatia elkneckensis – type locality for species
 †Hamulus
 †Hamulus falcatus
 †Hamulus huntensis – tentative report
 †Hamulus onyx
 †Hamulus squamosus
 †Hercorhynchus
 †Hercorhynchus trililatus
 †Hercorhyncus
 †Hercorhyncus pagodaformis
 †Hercorhyncus tippanus
 Heterodontus
 †Heteromorpha
 †Heteromorpha ammonite
  †Hoploparia
 †Hoploparia gladiator
  †Hybodus
 †Hydrotribulus
 †Hydrotribulus asper
 †Hyposaurus
 †Hyposaurus rogersii
 †Hypotodus
 †Hypsiloichnus – type locality for genus
 †Hypsiloichnus marylandicus – type locality for species

I

  †Inoceramus
 †Ischyodus
 †Ischyrhiza
 †Ischyrhiza avonicola – or unidentified comparable form
 †Ischyrhiza mira

J

  †Jeletzkytes
 †Jeletzkytes criptonodosus
 †Jeletzkytes nebrascensis
 Juliacorbula
 †Juliacorbula monmouthensis

L

 Laternula
 †Laternula robusta
 †Latiala
 †Latiala lobata – or unidentified comparable form
  Latiaxis
 †Legumen
 †Legumen ellipticum
 †Legumen planulatum
  Lepisosteus
 †Leptosolen
 †Leptosolen biplicata
 †Leptosolen elongata
 Lima
 †Lima pelagica
 Limatula
 †Limatula acutilineata
 †Linearia
 †Linearia crebelli
 †Linearis
 †Linearis metastriata
 †Liopeplum
 †Liopeplum canalis
 †Liopeplum coronatum
 †Liopeplum cretaceum
 †Liopistha
 †Liopistha prolexta
 †Liopistha protexta
  Lithophaga
 †Lithophaga carolinensis
 †Lithophaga julia
 †Longitubus
 †Longitubus lineatus
 †Longoconcha
  Lopha
 †Lopha falcata
 †Lopha mesenterica
 †Lowenstamia
 †Lowenstamia cucullata
 †Loxsomopteris – type locality for genus
 †Loxsomopteris anasilla – type locality for species
 †Lupira
 †Lycettia
 †Lycettia tippana
 †Lycettia tippanus
 †Lyriochlamys
 †Lyriochlamys cretosa
 †Lyriochlamys cretosus

M

 Malletia
 †Malletia littlei
 †Malletia longfrons
 †Malletia longifrons
 †Malletia stephensoni
 †Mathilda
 †Mathilda cedarensis – or unidentified comparable form
 †Mathilda corona
 †Mauldinia – type locality for genus
 †Mauldinia mirabilis – type locality for species
 †Menabites
 †Menabites delawarensis
 †Menabites vanuxemi
 †Mesostoma
 †Micrabacia
 †Micrabacia marylandica
 †Micrabacia radiata
  †Modiolus
 †Modiolus sedesclaris
 †Modiolus sedesclarus
 †Modiolus trigonus
 †Morea
 †Morea cancellaria
 †Morea marylandica
  †Mosasaurus
 †Mosasaurus conodon
 †Mosasaurus dekayi
 †Mosasaurus maximus
  Myliobatis
 †Myliobatis obesus
 †Myobarbum
 †Myobarbum monmouthensis – tentative report
 Myrtea
 †Myrtea stephensoni
  †Mytilus – tentative report

N

 †Napulus
 †Napulus octoliratus
  Nebrius
 †Nemodon
 †Nemodon eufalensis
 †Nemodon eufaulensis
 †Nemodon stantoni
 †Nonactaeonina
 †Nonactaeonina graphoides – or unidentified comparable form
  Nucula
 †Nucula camia
 †Nucula cuneifrons
 †Nucula percrassa
 †Nucula perequalis
 †Nucula severnensis
 †Nucula slackiana
 Nuculana
 †Nuculana rostratruncata
 †Nuculana whitfieldi
 †Nymphalucina
 †Nymphalucina linearia

O

  Odontaspis
 †Odontaspis aculeatus
 †Odontaspis macrota
 †Odontobasis
 †Odontobasis sulcata – or unidentified comparable form
 †Oligoptycha
 †Opertochasma
 †Osteopygis
 †Osteopygis emarginatus

P

 †Paladmete
 †Paladmete cancellaria
 †Paladmete laevis
 †Paleopsephaea
 †Paleopsephaea tenuilirata
 Panopea
 †Panopea decisa
 †Panopea monmouthensis
 †Paralbula
 †Paralbula casei
 †Parmicorbula
 †Parmicorbula percompressa
 †Parmicorbula terramaria
 †Pelletixia
 †Pelletixia amelguita – type locality for species
 †Periplomya
 †Peritresius
 †Peritresius ornatus
 †Perrisonota
 †Perrisonota littlei
 †Perrisonota protexta
 †Phelopteria
 †Phelopteria linguaeformis
 †Phelopteria linguiformis
  Pholas
 †Pinna
 †Pinna laqueata
  †Placenticeras
 †Placenticeras placenta
 †Placenticeras syrtale
 †Platananthus
 †Platananthus potomacensis – type locality for species
 †Platanocarpus – type locality for genus
 †Platanocarpus elkneckensis – type locality for species
 †Platanocarpus marylandensis – type locality for species
 †Pleuriocardia
 †Pleuriocardia eufalensis
 †Pleurocoelus – type locality for genus
 †Pleurocoelus altus – type locality for species
 †Pleurocoelus nanus – type locality for species
 †Plicatoscyllium
 †Plicatoscyllium antiquum
 †Plicatoscyllium derameei
  Polinices
 †Polinices kummeli
 †Postligata
 †Postligata wordeni
 †Praeleda
 †Praeleda compar
   †Priconodon – type locality for genus
 †Priconodon crassus – type locality for species
   †Prognathodon
 †Prognathodon rapax
 †Promathildia
 †Promathildia parvula – or unidentified comparable form
 †Propanoplosaurus – type locality for genus
 †Propanoplosaurus marylandicus – type locality for species
 †Protocallianassa
 †Protocallianassa mortoni
 †Protocardia
 †Protocardia spillmani
 †Pseudohypolophus
 †Pseudohypolophus menultyi
 †Pseudolimea
 †Pseudolimea reticulata
 †Pseudolimea serrata
 Pseudomalaxis
 †Pseudomalaxis pateriformis
 †Pseudomalaxis pilsbryi
 †Pseudomalaxis stantoni
  †Pteria
 †Pteria rhombica
 †Pterocerella
 †Pterocerella tippana
  †Pterotrigonia
 †Pterotrigonia eufalensis
 †Pterotrigonia eufaulensis
 †Pterotrigonia thoracica
 †Ptychotrygon
 †Ptychotrygon vermiculata
 †Pugnellus
 †Pugnellus densatus
 Pycnodonte
 †Pycnodonte vesicularis
 †Pyrifusus
 †Pyrifusus crassus
 †Pyrifusus subdensatus
 †Pyropsis
 †Pyropsis perlata
 †Pyropsis prolixa

R

 Raja
 †Raja farishi
 †Remera
 †Remera cretacea – or unidentified comparable form
 †Remera flexicostata
 †Remera juncea
 †Remnita
 †Remnita anomalocostata
 †Remnita biacuminata – or unidentified comparable form
 †Remnita hastata
  Rhinobatos
  †Rhombodus
 †Rhombodus binkhorsti
 †Rhombopsis
 Ringicula
 †Ringicula clarki
 †Ringicula pulchella
 Rissoina
 †Rissoina tennesseensis

S

 †Sargana
 †Sargana stantoni
 †Scambula
 †Scambula perplana
  †Scaphites
 †Scaphites hippocrepis
 Serpula
  †Serratolamna
 †Serratolamna serrata
 †Serrifusus – tentative report
 †Solariorbis
 †Solariorbis clara – or unidentified comparable form
 †Solyma
 †Solyma elliptica
 †Solyma gardnerae
 †Sourimis
 †Sourimis georgiana – tentative report
 †Spanomera
 †Spanomera marylandensis
 †Sphenodiscus
 †Sphenodiscus lobatus
 †Sphenodiscus pleurisepta
  Squalicorax
 †Squalicorax falcatus
 †Squalicorax kaupi
 †Squalicorax pristodontus
  Squatina
 †Squatina hassei
 †Stantonella
 †Stantonella interrupta
 †Stephanodus
 Striarca
 †Striarca cuneata
 †Striarca saffordi
 †Striaticostatum
 †Striaticostatum sparsum
 †Striatopollis
 †Striatopollis paraneus
 †Striatopollis vermimurus
 †Syncyclonema
 †Syncyclonema simplicius

T

 Tellina
 †Tellinimera
 †Tellinimera buboana
 †Tellinimera gabbi
 †Tenea
 †Tenea parilis
  †Tenontosaurus
 †Tenuipteria
 †Tenuipteria argentea
 †Tenuipteria argenteus
  †Thoracosaurus
 †Thoracosaurus neocesariensis
 Trachycardium
 †Trachycardium eufaulensis
 †Trachytriton
  Turritella
 †Turritella bilira
 †Turritella hilgardi
 †Turritella paravertebroides
 †Turritella tippana
 †Turritella trilira
 †Turritella vertebroides

U

 †Urceolabrum
 †Urceolabrum tuberculatum

V

 †Veniella
 †Veniella conradi
 †Vetericardiella
 †Vetericardiella crenalirata
 †Vorhisia

W

 †Weeksia
 †Weeksia peplanata

X

 †Xylophagella
 †Xylophagella irregularis

References
 

Mesozoic
Maryland